The Italian Catholic diocese of Calabria in Calabria existed until 1986. In that year it was combined into the archdiocese of Catanzaro-Squillace. It was a suffragan of the archdiocese of Reggio in Calabria.

History
Invasions of Saracens in the ninth and tenth centuries, a landing of the Turks in 1595, and the earthquake of 1783 caused the ruin of Squillace. St. Bruno established two Carthusian monasteries within the limits of the diocese, S. Maria dell' Eremo and S. Stefano in Nemore, the latter having the less rigorous discipline. 

The first known Bishop of Squillace is Gaudentius (465); Zachæus accompanied Pope Vigilius to Constantinople (551); John, previously Bishop of Lissa, in Dalmatia, having been driven out by the barbarians, was transferred to Squillace by Gregory the Great. After Bishop Demetrius (870), no bishops are mentioned until the Norman conquest, after which Count Roger erected the cathedral, into which the Latin Rite was introduced, while the Greek Rite continued much longer in the diocese. 

The series of bishops commences again with Theodore Mismer (1094). Other bishops were: 
Francesco degli Arcesi (1418–1476); 
Cardinal Enrigo Borgia (1539); 
Cardinal Guglielmo Sirleto (1568);
his nephew, Marcello Sirleto (1573); 
Tommaso Sirleto (1594);
Fabrizio Sirleto (1693); 
Nicolò Micheli. 

The territory of Squillace contains Stilo, the ancient Consilinum, three bishops of which are known, Sabinus (495) being the earliest.

Ordinaries

Diocese of Squillace
Erected: 4th Century
Immediately Subject to the Holy See

Enrique de Borja y Aragón (17 Dec 1539 – 16 Sep 1540 Died) 
Enrique de Villalobos Xeres (5 Nov 1540 – 1554 Died)
Alfonso de Villalobos Xeres (1554–1568 Resigned) 
Guglielmo Sirleto (27 Feb 1568 – 29 May 1573 Resigned) 
Tommaso Sirleto (5 Sep 1594 – 1601 Died) 
Paolo Isaresi della Mirandola, O.P. (13 Aug 1601 – 1602 Died)
Fabrizio Sirleto (7 Apr 1603 – 1 Apr 1635 Died) 
Lodovico Saffiro (17 Sep 1635 – Nov 1635 Died)
Giuseppe della Corgna (Cornea), O.P. (22 Sep 1636 – 20 Mar 1656 Appointed, Bishop of Orvieto) 
Rodolfo Dulcino (12 Mar 1657 – 10 Oct 1664 Died) 
Francesco Tirotta (13 Apr 1665 – 17 Jan 1676 Died)
Paolo Filocamo (bishop) (27 Apr 1676 – 14 Sep 1687 Died)
Alfonso de Aloysio (31 May 1688 – May 1694 Died)
Gennaro Crespino (19 Jul 1694 – Sep 1697 Died) 
Fortunato Durante (20 Nov 1697 – 23 Nov 1714 Died) 
Marco Antonio Attaffi (11 Feb 1718 – 17 Aug 1733 Died) 
Nicola Michele Abati (Abbate) (28 Sep 1733 – 6 May 1748 Died) 
Francesco Saverio Maria Queralt y Aragona (6 May 1748 – 11 Nov 1762 Died) 
Diego Genovesi (21 Mar 1763 – 26 May 1778 Died) 
Nicolas Notariis (20 Jul 1778 – 8 Jul 1802 Died) 
Nicola Antonio Montiglia (25 May 1818 Confirmed – 27 Sep 1824 Confirmed, Bishop of Nicotera e Tropea) 
Andrea Rispoli, C.SS.R. (13 Mar 1826 Confirmed – 18 Sep 1839 Died) 
Concezio Pasquini (22 Jul 1842 Confirmed – 21 Dec 1857 Confirmed, Bishop of Ariano) 
Raffaele Antonio Morisciano (27 Sep 1858 – 1 Sep 1909 Died) 
Eugenio Tosi, O.Ss.C.A. (5 Apr 1911 – 22 Mar 1917 Appointed, Bishop of Andria) 
Giorgio Giovanni Elli (23 Feb 1918 – 10 Feb 1920 Died) 
Antonio Melomo (17 Mar 1922 – 7 Feb 1927 Appointed, Bishop of Monopoli) 
Giovanni Fiorentini (23 Dec 1927 – 16 Jun 1950 Resigned) 
Armando Fares (16 Jun 1950 – 31 Jul 1980 Retired) 
Antonio Cantisani (31 Jul 1980 – 30 Sep 1986 Appointed, Archbishop of Catanzaro-Squillace)

30 September 1986: United with the Archdiocese of Catanzaro to form the Archdiocese of Catanzaro-Squillace

References
Cappelletti, Le chiese d'Italia, XXI

Notes

External links
Source

Squillace